is a Japanese football player currently playing for Tochigi SC.

Club career statistics
Updated to 28 February 2020.

1Includes Promotion Playoffs to J1.

References

External links

1984 births
Living people
Meiji University alumni
Association football people from Yamaguchi Prefecture
Japanese footballers
J1 League players
J2 League players
FC Machida Zelvia players
Ehime FC players
V-Varen Nagasaki players
Tochigi SC players
Association football midfielders